Major-General Sir Neill Malcolm, KCB, DSO (8 October 1869 – 21 December 1953) was a British Army officer who served as Chief of Staff to Fifth Army in the First World War and later commanded the Troops in the Straits Settlements.

Military career

Educated at St Peter's School, York, Eton College and the Royal Military College, Sandhurst, Malcolm was commissioned into the Argyll and Sutherland Highlanders as a second lieutenant on 20 February 1889. He was promoted to lieutenant on 23 August 1893. In 1896 he travelled with Capt. Montagu Sinclair Wellby across Tibet and northern China. He served with the 2nd battalion under Sir William Lockhart in the Tochi Field Force on the North West Frontier of India in 1897. Following a stint in Uganda, where he conducted operations in Shuli country, he was appointed a Companion of the Distinguished Service Order (DSO) and promoted to captain on 21 December 1898. He served with mounted infantry in the Second Boer War in South Africa from late 1899, and took part in the Battle of Paardeberg in February 1900, where he was severely wounded by a gunshot in his thigh.

After his return to the United Kingdom, he was made Deputy Assistant Quartermaster General at Army Headquarters in 1906 and Secretary of the Historical Section of the Committee of Imperial Defence in 1908 before becoming a General Staff Officer at the Staff College, Camberley in 1912. He served in the First World War as a General Staff Officer with the British Expeditionary Force, with the Mediterranean Expeditionary Force and then as Chief of Staff to Hubert Gough's Fifth Army in France. He was then General Officer Commanding 66th Division from December 1917, 39th Division from 1918 and 30th Division from later that year. After the war he was Chief of the British Military Mission to Berlin from 1919 and then General Officer Commanding the Troops in the Straits Settlements in 1921 before retiring in 1924.

It has been suggested that Malcolm, while in Berlin, provided the origin of the phrase 'stabbed in the back' to describe the reason for the German defeat. In the autumn of 1919, when Erich Ludendorff was dining with Malcolm, Malcolm asked Ludendorff why he thought Germany lost the war. Ludendorff replied with a list of excuses, including that the home front failed the army. Malcolm asked him: "Do you mean, General, that you were stabbed in the back?" Ludendorff's eyes lit up and he leapt upon the phrase like a dog on a bone. "Stabbed in the back?" he repeated. "Yes, that's it, exactly, we were stabbed in the back." And thus was born a legend which has never entirely perished.

Later life 

In retirement he was President of the North Borneo Chartered Company from 1926 to 1946 and High Commissioner for German refugees from 1936 to 1938.

Family
In May 1907 he married his cousin, Angela Malcolm; they had a daughter and two sons, one of whom was the British diplomat Dugald Malcolm.

References

External links

|-
 

1869 births
1953 deaths
British Army major generals
British Army generals of World War I
Knights Commander of the Order of the Bath
Companions of the Distinguished Service Order
Argyll and Sutherland Highlanders officers
People educated at St Peter's School, York
People educated at Eton College
Academics of the Staff College, Camberley
British Army personnel of the Second Boer War
Graduates of the Royal Military College, Sandhurst
Military personnel from London